The 28th Arizona State Legislature, consisting of the Arizona State Senate and the Arizona House of Representatives, was constituted in Phoenix from January 1, 1967, to December 31, 1968, during Jack Williams' first term as Governor of Arizona. The make-up of both houses was changed drastically by the implementation of districts, rather than the old system of county representation. The fourteen counties were broken up into 8 districts. Four of the districts (1, 2, 3, and 5) consisted of multiple counties, while the other four (4, 6, 7, and 8) represented single counties. In addition, Districts Seven and Eight, representing Pima and Maricopa Counties respectively, were further broken down into sub-districts.  District 7 had eight sub-districts, 7-A through 7-F, while District 8 had fifteen sub-districts, 8-A through 8-O. The number of senators increased to 30, with the balance of power shifting drastically.  Where Democrats had held a 26–2 majority in the prior legislature, Republicans now held a slim 16-14 majority. While the number of senators increased, the number of representatives decreased from 80 to 60.  Again, the balance of power shifted to the Republicans, who now held 33-27 majority in the lower house. It was the first time Arizona history where the Republicans won control of both houses of the legislature.

Sessions
The Legislature met for two regular sessions at the State Capitol in Phoenix. The first opened on January 9, 1967, and adjourned on March 13; while the second convened on January 8, 1968, and adjourned on March 21. There were four Special Sessions, three in 1967, and the last one in 1968.  The first Special Session convened May 31, 1967, and adjourned sine die on June 2; the second convened on October 30, 1967, and adjourned sine die on November 17; the Third Special Session convened on November 27, 1967, and adjourned sine die on December 22; with the final Special Session, the fourth, convened May 8, 1968 and adjourned sine die on June 7.

State Senate

Members

The asterisk (*) denotes members of the previous Legislature who continued in office as members of this Legislature.

The ** denotes Carpenter was elected and died in office, Gregovich was appointed to replace him
The *** denotes Beaham was elected and died in office, Cardella was appointed to replace him

House of Representatives

Members 
The asterisk (*) denotes members of the previous Legislature who continued in office as members of this Legislature.

The *** denotes that Clay B. Simer was elected, but resigned. Biles, who had served in the prior legislature, was appointed to succeed him.
The **** denotes that Davidson Jenks was elected, but resigned and Faron was appointed to replace him.

References

Arizona legislative sessions
1967 in Arizona
1968 in Arizona
1967 U.S. legislative sessions
1968 U.S. legislative sessions